Herbert Maxwell Strong (September 30, 1908, Wooster, Ohio – January 30, 2002, Schenectady, New York) was an American physicist and inventor, known as part of the General Electric (GE) team of researchers who synthesized diamonds in late 1954, as announced by GE in early 1955.

Education and career
Herbert M. Strong graduated in 1930 with a B.S. from the University of Toledo. At Ohio State University he was a graduate student in physics and graduated in 1931 with an M.S. and in 1936 with a Ph.D. His doctoral adviser was Harold Paul Knauss (1900–1963), who was the author of the 1951 textbook Discovering Physics. Strong was employed in Chicago by the Kendall Company, where he worked on the physics and chemistry of adhesives. In 1946 he became a research associate at the General Electric Research Laboratory in Schenectady, New York, where he worked until he retired in 1973.

At GE, he worked on "the hot supersonic exhaust flames from rocket motors on test stands." His next major project was research on heat transfer and the "development of a thin, evacuated, flat-panel thermal insulation for use in refrigerators, freezers, and other cooling devices."

Strong is credited with 23 U.S. patents. In 1977 he, along with Francis P. Bundy, H. Tracy Hall, and Robert H. Wentorf Jr., received the International Prize for New Materials, now called the James C. McGroddy Prize for New Materials, for "their outstanding research contributions and inventions which include the first reproducible process for making diamond; the synthesis of cubic boron nitride; and the development of the high pressure processes that are required to produce these materials."

In retirement, Strong, with other local physicists, participated in a program sponsored by Schenectady's Museum of Innovation and Science. The program enabled schoolchildren to participate "in simple demonstrations of gravity, optics, magnetism, conservation of momentum, and other basic physical phenomena."

Selected publications

References

1908 births
2002 deaths
20th-century American physicists
21st-century American physicists
20th-century American inventors
21st-century American inventors
General Electric people
People from Wooster, Ohio
Scientists from Ohio
University of Toledo alumni
Ohio State University alumni